Tanja Schultz is a German computer scientist specializing in speech processing. She is  professor of computer science at the University of Bremen and the former president of the International Speech Communication Association.

Education and career
Schultz was a student at the Karlsruhe Institute of Technology, where she earned a diploma in 1995 and a doctorate in 2000. Her dissertation, Multilingual Speech Recognition, was jointly supervised by Alex Waibel and Dirk Van Compernolle. She was a faculty member at Carnegie Mellon University from 2000 to 2007 and at the Karlsruhe Institute of Technology from 2007 to 2015 before moving to the University of Bremen in 2015.

Recognition
In 2002, Schultz was part of a group of eight researchers who won the Allen Newell Medal for Research Excellence for their work on automatic speech translation.

Schultz was named a fellow of the International Speech Communication Association in 2016 "for contributions to multilingual speech recognition and biosignal processing for human-machine interaction". She is also a member of the European Academy of Sciences and Arts.

References

External links

20th-century births
Living people
German computer scientists
Karlsruhe Institute of Technology alumni
Carnegie Mellon University faculty
Academic staff of the Karlsruhe Institute of Technology
Academic staff of the University of Bremen
Members of the European Academy of Sciences and Arts
Year of birth missing (living people)
Place of birth missing (living people)